Joaquín Edwards Bello (May 10, 1887 – February 19, 1968) was a Chilean writer and journalist of British descent.

Life
Edwards Bello was born in Valparaíso, one of the most important ports in Chile. His family, the Edwards, is still one of the most influential in the country.
Joaquín studied at The Mackay School and later at the Liceo Eduardo de la Barra. To complete his education, his family decided in 1904 to send him to Europe.
His first novel, El inútil (The Useless One would be the translation), generated such reactions in Santiago that he emigrated to Brazil for some time. The main character was Eduardo Briset Lacerda, a rich young man with social conscience, like Edwards.

Awards
Atenea Award, University of Concepción (1932)
Premio Marcial Martínez (1934)
Premio Nacional de Literatura de Chile (1943)
National Prize for Journalism (1959)
Decoration Hijo Ilustre de Valparaíso (1958)

Bibliography
 El inútil (Santiago, Imprenta y Litografía Universo, 1910)
 El mounstruo: novela de costumbres chilenas (Imprenta La Ilustración)
 El roto (Santiago, Editorial Chilena, 1920)
 La muerte de Vanderbilt (Cóndor, 1922)
 El nacionalismo continental (Madrid, Imp. G. Hernández y Galo Sáez, 1925;  ampliada con 2ª y 3ª partes, Santiago, Ediciones Ercilla, 1935)
 El chileno en Madrid (Santiago, Nascimento, 1928)
 Cap Polonio (La novela nueva, 1929)
 Valparaíso, la ciudad del viento (Santiago, Nascimento, 1931).
 Criollos en París (Santiago, Nascimento, 1933)
 La chica del Crillón (Santiago, Ercilla, 1935)
 Crónicas (Santiago, Zig-Zag, 1964)

See also
Edwards family

References

External links
 Memoria Chilena - Joaquín Edwards Bello
Joaquín Edwards Bello recorded at the Library of Congress for the Hispanic Division's audio literary archive on August 8, 1977.

Andrés Bello
J
Chilean male novelists
20th-century Chilean male writers
Chilean journalists
Male journalists
Chilean people of Canarian descent
Chilean people of Venezuelan descent
Chilean people of Welsh descent
Members of the Chilean Academy of Language
People from Valparaíso
1887 births
1968 deaths
National Prize for Literature (Chile) winners
Suicides by firearm in Chile
20th-century Chilean novelists
20th-century journalists